The Buor-Yuryakh (Buor-Ürex) is a river in the Sakha Republic (Yakutia), Russia. It is the second largest tributary of the Chondon.

The Buor-Yuryakh flows north of the Arctic Circle, across desolate territories of the Ust-Yansky District. The name of the river comes from the Yakut "Буор Үрэх" "Buor" = earth, clay / "Yurekh" = river.

Course
The Buor-Yuryakh is a left tributary of the Chondon. It has its sources in the northeastern slopes of the Kyundyulyun at the feet of  hign Gory Krest mountain. The river flows roughly eastwards across a floodplain among numerous lakes forming meanders all along its course. Finally the Buor-Yuryakh joins the Chondon  from its mouth.

Tributaries  
The Buor-Yuryakh is frozen between the end of September and early June.

See also
List of rivers of Russia

References

External links 
Fishing & Tourism in Yakutia

Tributaries of the Chondon
Rivers of the Sakha Republic
East Siberian Lowland
Chondon basin